The Order of Saint Peter of Cetinje (Serbian Cyrillic: Орден Светог Петра Цетињског) is the a dynastic order of the Royal House of Petrović-Njegoš. As Montenegro is now a republic, the order is distributed as a private house order of the deposed family. The Order is bestowed upon prominent members of the Petrović-Njegoš family, as well as to others.

The name of Prince Danilo, the first Montenegrin ruler with a purely secular title, is inscribed on the Decoration. 

The Order was named after the Patron Saint of the Montenegrin Orthodox Church, Prince-Bishop (Vladika) Peter I Petrović, the person who effectively obtained independence for Montenegro, and to whom is attributed the creation of the modern Montenegrin State.

Officers of the Order
 Grand Master: Nicholas, Prince of Montenegro 
 Grand Chancellor: Boris, Hereditary Prince of Montenegro (29 August 2012)

Recipients
 Princess Véronique of Montenegro, Grand Duchess of Grahavo and Zeta 
 Princess Milena of Montenegro

 Borwin, Duke of Mecklenburg
 Alice, Duchess of Mecklenburg

References

Orders, decorations, and medals of Montenegro
Peter of Cetinje